Bad Channels is a 1992 American science fiction spoof direct-to-video film, produced by Full Moon Features and released by Paramount Home Video. It is about two aliens (Cosmo and Lump) who invade a radio station with the intention of capturing female humans, by using radio broadcasts. The hero is a DJ forced to combat the aliens alone when listeners think he is joking about the invasion.

The film also has its own soundtrack composed and performed by Blue Öyster Cult.

Synopsis 

KDUL is a new radio station, running a promotion with DJ Dangerous Dan chained to a chair until a listener calls and guesses the combination of the locks. When the combination is guessed, a TV journalist, Lisa, feels the solution was faked and the promotion was a fraud. As the journalist makes her way to the station to confront the DJ, she sees a UFO.

Two aliens invade a radio station, using a device to capture female listeners. As they are captured, the women picture themselves as starring in a music video. After the video is completed, the alien is able to  shrink and imprison the women in clear tubes. Among those captured are a nurse (Melissa Behr), waitress, and a cheerleader.

Realizing what the aliens have planned, the DJ warns his listeners to turn off the radio. Listeners think this occurrence is just another promotion. The alien attempts to capture reporter Lisa, but instead shrinks teenager Bunny.

He is not taken seriously by anyone until more women go missing, piquing the interest of the military. Eventually the DJ discovers that the aliens are weak to common disinfectant, using it to defeat them and rescue the women. All of the women—with the exception of Bunny—are returned to their normal size.

The broadcast attracts 10,000 listeners.

Cast
Paul Hipp as Dan O'Dare
Martha Quinn as Lisa Cummings
Aaron Lustig as Vernon Locknut
Ian Patrick Williams as Dr. Payne
Charlie Spradling as Cookie
Robert Factor as Willis
Roumel Reaux as Flip Humble 
Rodney Ueno as Moon
Daryl Strauss as Bunny

Critical response
Cinemaphile gave it a bad review, 0/4 stars, calling it a "mess" and saying "I fear that the creators of this movie must have had brain tissue damaged sometime in their lifetimes." The Film Fiend was more positive, calling it "hilariously cheesy". Classic Rock Magazine described the soundtrack as "a grotesque mistake".

IMDb.com has Bad Channels currently ranked 5.1/10 based on 980 ratings.

User Ochnop at Something Awful gave Bad Channels a -39 out of a -50 (being the worst) saying "Who could ask for anything more from a film besides a bag to throw up in? "Bad Channels" is truly something awful."

Creature Feature liked the movie, giving it 3.5 out of 5 stars. It found the movie to be one of the more inventive of those produced by Charles Band and enjoyed the cable news satire. However, Moira gave it one star, finding it ears out its premise and s padded. TV Guide agreed with Moria's review.

Entertainment Weekly gave the movie a D. While it found it to be cheerfully cheesy, it found that it needed to be funnier.

Production

Director Nicolauo initially didn't want to be involved with the movie, finding its story too close to his other recent movie Terrorvision. However, he was attracted to making the fake music videos. Pat Siciliano scouted bands for the movie and was instrumental in the final choice. The end credits crossover with Dollman (film) was shot in one day.

Sequel

A semi-sequel was released in the form of Dollman vs. Demonic Toys, a crossover film featuring characters from Dollman, Demonic Toys  and Bad Channels.

Merchandising
A set of collectible cards.

Soundtrack
Bad Channel featured a soundtrack album entitled, Bad Channels (album) that was composed and performed by Blue Blue Öyster Cult and also had feature songs from a few other bands such as Sykotik Sinfoney, Joker, Fair Game, and DMT.

Feature Songs 
 Blue Öyster Cult - Demon's Kiss 
 Blue Öyster Cult - Out of Darkness
 Sykotik Sinfoney - Mr. Cool
 Sykotik Sinfoney - Manic Depresso
 D.M.T - Myth of Freedom
 D.M.T - Touching Myself Again
 Fair Game - Blind Faith
 Fair Game - Somewhere in the Night
 Joker - That's How It Is
 Joker - Jane, Jane the Hurricane
 Blue Öyster Cult - The Horsemen Arrive
 F.U. 2 - Elegance
 The Ukelaliens - Pig Pen Polka
 The Ukelaliens - Little Old Lady
 The Ukelaliens - Jumping Jack Polka

In popular culture
The film was featured on an episode of Brandon's Movie Reviews.

References

External links

1992 films
1992 horror films
1990s science fiction horror films
American science fiction horror films
Films about size change
Films about extraterrestrial life
Films directed by Ted Nicolaou
Puppet films
Dollman films
Demonic Toys films
American direct-to-video films
Full Moon Features films
Paramount Pictures direct-to-video films
Films about radio people
1990s English-language films
1990s American films